Tawatchai Kuammungkun (born 3 May 1997) is a Thai professional footballer who plays as a right back for Thai League 1 club Chiangrai United.

Club career
In his youth career, Kuammungkun was trained for two and a half years at Leicester City in England.

Honours

Club
Chiangrai United
 Thai League 1 (1) : 2019
 Thai FA Cup (1) : 2018
 Thai League Cup (1) : 2018

References

External links

1997 births
Living people
Tawatchai Kuammungkun
Tawatchai Kuammungkun
Association football defenders
Tawatchai Kuammungkun
Tawatchai Kuammungkun
Tawatchai Kuammungkun
Tawatchai Kuammungkun
Tawatchai Kuammungkun
Expatriate footballers in England